= Walter Reed Hospital =

Walter Reed Hospital or Walter Reed Medical Center may refer to:

- Walter Reed National Military Medical Center (the current hospital in Bethesda, Maryland)
- Walter Reed Army Medical Center (the former hospital in Washington, DC, in operation until 2011)
